This is a chronological list of films and television programs that have been recognized as being pioneering in their use of computer animation.

1950s

1960s

1970s

1980s

1990s

2000s

2010s

2020s

See also
 Animation
 List of computer-animated films
 List of computer-animated television series

References

External links
 CG101: A Computer Graphics Industry Reference  Unique and personal histories of early computer graphics production, plus a comprehensive foundation of the industry for all reading levels.
 CG production companies and CGI in the movies - detailed historical information
 Milestones in Film History: Greatest Visual and Special Effects

Visual effects
CGI in movies
Film
Television technology
Lists of films and television series